Sextonville is an unincorporated census-designated place located in the town of Buena Vista in Richland County, Wisconsin, United States. Sextonville is located on U.S. Route 14 southeast of Richland Center. Sextonville has a post office with ZIP code 53584. As of the 2020 census, its population was 476.

Demographics
Sextonville has 422 residents, ranking it as the 565th most populous city in Wisconsin out of 806 communities. Whites make up the majority of Sextonville's racial/ethnic groups (100.0%).

References

Census-designated places in Richland County, Wisconsin
Census-designated places in Wisconsin